"Word From a Sealed-Off Box" was an American television play that was broadcast on October 30, 1958, as part of the CBS television series, Playhouse 90.

Plot
A courier for the Dutch underground is captured during World War I.

Cast
The cast included the following:

 Maria Schell as Gret
 Jean-Pierre Aumont as Harry
 Vivian Nathan as Frieda
 Betsy Von Furstenberg as Lisa
 Theodore Bikel as Rapp

Production
The program aired on October 30, 1958, on the CBS television series Playhouse 90. Mayo Smith wrote the teleplay based on the book, "The Walls Came Tumbling Down" by Henriette Roosenburg. Fred Coe was the producer and Franklin Schaffner the director.

References

1958 American television episodes
Playhouse 90 (season 3) episodes
1958 television plays